Calvin John Klaasen (born 1987) is a South African chess player who holds the title of FIDE Master.

Together with Johannes Mabusela he won the 2017 South African Closed Championships, and has played for the South African Chess Olympiad team in 2016 and 2018.

See also
 Chess in South Africa

References

External links

Calvin Klaasen chess games at 365Chess.com

Living people
South African chess players
Chess FIDE Masters
Chess Olympiad competitors
Place of birth missing (living people)
1987 births